Judith Blegen (April 27, 1943, Lexington, Kentucky) is an American soprano, particularly associated with light lyric roles of the French, Italian and German repertories.

Life and career
Blegen was raised and attended high school in Missoula, Montana, during which time she began voice lessons with John L. Lester, head of the voice department at the University of Montana.  She studied first the violin with Toshiya Eto, and later voice at the Curtis Institute of Music in Philadelphia with Eufemia Giannini-Gregory. In 1962 she attended the Music Academy of the West where she studied with Martial Singher. In Rome she studied with Luigi Ricci. She made her operatic debut in Nuremberg, Germany, as Olympia in The Tales of Hoffmann, in 1965, where she subsequently sang Lucia, Susanna, and Zerbinetta. That same year, she appeared in Spoleto, Italy, as Mélisande in Pelléas et Mélisande.

She made her debut with the Vienna State Opera as Olympia in Les contes d'Hoffmann in January 1969, and later that year appeared at the Santa Fe Opera as Emily in the premiere of Gian Carlo Menotti's Help, Help, the Globolinks!, a role requiring her both to sing and play the violin. Her New York Metropolitan Opera debut took place on January 19, 1970, as Papagena in The Magic Flute.  She sang over 200 performances of 19 roles at the Met including Marzelline, Zerlina, Susana, Nanetta, Sophie, Mélisande,  Adina, Gilda, Oscar, Juliette, Blondchen, Gretel, and Adele. She made her debuts at the London Opera House in London, in 1975, and at the Palais Garnier in Paris, in 1977.

In the 1970s Blegen appeared frequently on The Tonight Show Starring Johnny Carson where she performed the Christmas carol, O Holy Night .

A singer with a radiant voice, polished musicianship, and charming stage presence, Blegen retired in 1991. She was married to former Metropolitan Opera concertmaster Raymond Gniewek.

She is a 1983 recipient of the Montana Governor's Arts Award.

Recordings
Among Blegen's recordings are Alban Berg's "Lulu-Suite" (conducted by Pierre Boulez), Menotti's The Medium (with Regina Resnik), The Grammy Award winning RCA Red Seal recording of Puccini's La bohème (as Musetta, opposite Montserrat Caballé, Plácido Domingo, Sherrill Milnes, Vicente Sardinero and Ruggero Raimondi, conducted by Sir Georg Solti), Mozart's The Marriage of Figaro (as Susanna, with Heather Harper as the Contessa, conducted by Daniel Barenboim), Mozart's Zaide on the Orfeo label conducted by Leopold Hager, Carl Orff's Carmina Burana (with Robert Shaw conducting) and Joseph Haydn's oratorio The Creation conducted by Leonard Bernstein on Deutsche Grammophon.  She was also a featured soloist on James Levine's Deutsche Grammophon recording of Mendelssohn's A Midsummer Night's Dream, the soprano soloist on his RCA Red Seal recording of Mahler's Fourth Symphony and the Grammy award-winning Telarc recording of Gabriel Fauré's Requiem with the Atlanta Symphony Orchestra, under Robert Shaw. She was the soprano soloist on the album The Angelic Sounds of Christmas: Music for the Glass Armonica. She was also the soprano soloist on the first complete all-digital recording of Handel's Messiah, with the Musica Sacra Chorus and Orchestra, conducted by Richard Westenburg released by RCA Red Seal. Her performance of Carl Ruggles's song "Toys" is the opening track of Michael Tilson Thomas's The Complete Music of Carl Ruggles.

Blegen recorded three solo recital discs in her prime years including an acclaimed collection of lieder by Richard Strauss and Hugo Wolf issued by RCA Red Seal, arias by Mozart with Pinchas Zukerman conducting, and arias and cantatas by Handel and Alessandro Scarlatti conducted by Gerard Schwarz, both on Columbia Masterworks).  She also made a joint recital recording of art songs and duets with Frederica von Stade, also for the Columbia label, which introduced both young singers to the record-buying public in 1975.

Discography
 Judith Blegen and Frederica von Stade: Songs, Arias and Duets, with the Chamber Music Society of Lincoln Center, Columbia, 1975
 Joseph Haydn: Harmoniemesse, with Frederica von Stade, Kenneth Riegel, Simon Estes, the Westminster Choir and the New York Philharmonic Orchestra, conducted by Leonard Bernstein, Columbia, 1975
 Felix Mendelssohn: A Midsummer Night's Dream, with Frederica von Stade, the Women's Voices of the Mendelssohn Club of Philadelphia and the Philadelphia Orchestra, conducted by Eugene Ormandy, RCA, 1977

Videography 
 Verdi: Un ballo in maschera (Katia Ricciarelli, Luciano Pavarotti, Louis Quilico; Giuseppe Patanè, Elijah Moshinsky, 1980) [live]
 Donizetti: L'elisir d'amore (Pavarotti, Ellis, Sesto Bruscantini; Nicola Rescigno, Nathaniel Merrill, 1981) [live]
 R.Strauss: Der Rosenkavalier (Kiri Te Kanawa, Tatiana Troyanos, Kurt Moll; James Levine, Nathaniel Merrill/Donnell, 1982) [live]
 Humperdinck: Hansel and Gretel (Frederica von Stade, Rosalind Elias, Jean Kraft, Michael Devlin; Fulton, Donnell, 1982) [live]
 The Metropolitan Opera Centennial Gala (Frederica von Stade, Jeffrey Tate, 1983) [live]

References
General
 The Metropolitan Opera Encyclopedia, edited by David Hamilton (Simon & Schuster, New York, 1987). 
Specific

External links

Discography at SonyBMG Masterworks
Judith Blegen (Soprano) bach-cantatas.com
Interview with Judith Blegen by Bruce Duffie, October 1, 1986

American operatic sopranos
Living people
Musicians from Missoula, Montana
1943 births
Musicians from Lexington, Kentucky
Curtis Institute of Music alumni
Singers from Montana
20th-century American women opera singers
Kentucky women musicians
Singers from Kentucky
Music Academy of the West alumni
21st-century American women